{{automatic taxobox
| image = Mistletoe Muellerina eucalyptoides.jpg 
| image_caption=Muellerina eucalyptoides on Eucalyptus haemastoma, Ku-ring-gai Chase National Park, 27 January 2017
| taxon = Muellerina (plant)
| authority = Tiegh.
| subdivision_ranks = Species
}}Muellerina is a genus of parasitic aerial shrubs in the family Loranthaceae.

This Loranthaceae genus is distinguished from others by having
Petals free to base or almost so
Anthers dorsifixed, versatile
Aerial stem-parasitic shrubs with epicortical runners
Petals 5, curved; stamens unequal

Species include:Muellerina bidwillii  (Benth.) BarlowMuellerina celastroides   (Sieber ex Schult. & Schult.f) Tiegh.Muellerina eucalyptoides   (DC.) BarlowMuellerina flexialabastra   Downey & C.A.WilsonMuellerina myrtifolia   (A.Cunn. ex Benth.) Barlow

Ecology
The larvae of the Australian butterflies Delias harpalyce and Ogyris genoveva feed on Muellerina.

An inventory of host plants for Muellerina  spp. is given by Downey

TaxonomyMuellerina  is a  member of Santalales, the mistletoe order, and is placed within the family Loranthaceae.  The name Muellerina was first published by Philippe Édouard Léon Van Tieghem in 1895, where one New Zealand species, Muellerina raoullii, and two Australian species (Muellerina celastroides and M. eucalyptifolia - now M. eucalyptoides) are given. Further Australian Muellerina'' species are listed in van Tieghem.
A further article by van Tieghem further discussing the relationships of Loranthaceae genera is van Tieghem.

Image gallery

References

External links
 
 

Parasitic plants
 
Loranthaceae genera